The Hospital Psiquiátrico de La Habana Comandante Doctor Eduardo Bernabé Ordaz Ducunge, better known as Mazorra (the name of the estate upon which it was built), is a Cuban psychiatric hospital located in north of Wajay, Boyeros, in the city of Havana.

History
In 1857 it was founded with the name .

Horrible conditions at the hospital prior to the Cuban Revolution were documented in a series of photos which the Cuban state often uses to justify the need for the revolution. At the first session of the Communist Party of Cuba it was stated that:

In 2010 a number of patients died - according to the Catholic Church due to abandonment, bad state of the hospital, and theft of food, medicine and coats to sell on the black market. The estimated number of dead varies from 26 according to the Cuban state to 50 according to anti-government activists. As a result the Church requested urgent reform and opening to the private sector in the emblematic (state-run) health care sector. due to corruption, lack of resources, and bad service.

Currently Mazorra occupies 36 buildings dedicated to hospitalization, labs, parks, sport and recreation areas, occupational therapy, teaching, security and administration. It has a capacity of 2,500 beds according to the Cuban state.

References

External links
 Official website
 "Hospital Psiquiátrico de La Habana", EcuRed (Cuban online encyclopedia, state-approved)
 "Valoraciones: Eduardo Bernabé Ordaz Ducungé: Un héroe en la memoria", Bohemia  (Cuban state publication)

Hospitals in Cuba
Buildings and structures in Havana
1857 establishments in Cuba
Hospitals established in 1857
19th-century architecture in Cuba